The Collegio Teutonico (German College), historically often referred to by its Latin name Collegium Germanicum, is one of the Pontifical Colleges of Rome. The German College is the Pontifical College established for future ecclesiastics of German nationality. It is divided into two separate colleges; the Pontificio Collegio Teutonico di S. Maria dell’ Anima and the Collegio Teutonico del Campo Santo.

Pontificio Collegio Teutonico di S. Maria dell’ Anima
 
The Collegio Teutonico di S. Maria dell’ Anima is a residential college for priests who study at one of the Pontifical Athenaeums for advanced studies or work in the Roman Curia. It includes Santa Maria dell'Anima, the church of the German-speaking Catholics in Rome, and the adjacent Priests' College, a residential college of priests.

Collegio Teutonico del Campo Santo

The site of the Campo Santo dei Tedeschi goes back to the days of Charlemagne and was then called the Schola Francorum, a hospice for pilgrims. In the course of time the German residents in Rome were buried in the church of the Schola, then called S. Salvatore in Turri.
In 1454 a confraternity was established, and in addition the guilds of German bakers and cobblers had their quarters there. In 1876, the hospice was replaced by the Collegio Teutonico del Campo Santo, to receive priests belonging to the German Empire or German provinces of Austria, who remained there for about two years pursuing their studies and officiating in the Church of Santa Maria della Pietà in Camposanto dei Teutonici. 

The college has a library specializing in Christian archeology with an important collection of early Christian art put together by Rector Anton de Waal. In 1888 the Roman institute of the Görres Society (Görresgesellschaft) was established at the college. together they publish a quarterly review, the "Römische Quartalschrift fur christliche Archäologie und Kirchengeschichte"

During World War I, the Italian government laid claim to the College Teutonico, but the attempt failed.

During World War II, Monsignor Hugh O'Flaherty operated the “Rome Escape Line” clandestinely from his room in the Collegio Teutonico.
O'Flaherty and his associates managed to hide about 6,500 escapees, mainly Allied soldiers and Jews, in flats, farms and convents. Some young Italians avoiding miitary service also found refuge at the college.  

Pope Benedict XVI raised the college to the Pontifical College of Priests.

Location

The Campo Santo is located within the Vatican borders next to the historic cemetery of German pilgrims in Rome. The adjacent church, Santa Maria della Pietà in Camposanto dei Teutonici, is outside the Vatican, but governed by the 1929 Lateran Treaty and has extraterritorial status. It can only be accessed from inside the Vatican.

The Campo Santo houses the "Archconfraternity of Santa Maria della Pietà in the Campo Santo dei Teutonici and Fiamminghi", the Teutonic College of Santa Maria in Campo Santo, and the Roman Institute of the Görres Society. The Archconfraternity is the owner of the entire complex.

See also
 Franz Joseph Dölger
 Roman Colleges
 Santa Maria della Pietà in Camposanto dei Teutonici
 Teutonic Cemetery

References

External links
 
 Campo Santo website
 Roman institute of the Society of Görres

1399 establishments
Catholic Church in Austria
Catholic Church in Germany
Educational institutions established in the 14th century
Properties of the Holy See
Roman Colleges
Universities and colleges in Rome